Pikeville High School (PHS) is located in Pikeville, Kentucky, United States.  It enrolls approximately 560 students in grades 7-12.  It is part of the Pikeville Independent Schools.

History

Campus
Moving from a location closer to the downtown area of Pikeville, the current high school building was constructed in 1976. It consisted of classrooms, a library, a central two-story common area, and a gymnasium; dedicated and named after T.W. Oliver. In 1996, a large auditorium was added adjacent to the school on its eastern side.  Capable of seating 1000, it was built to augment the building and provide space for performances by the arts and music departments, which previously had been relegated to performing in the gymnasium.  Further modifications to the school included a second level weight room elevated above the school's south end, adjacent to the gymnasium, and an outdoor gathering area and veterans' memorial.  The entire school received an outdoor remodel in the mid 2000s.

Curriculum

Extracurricular activities
The Pikeville teams, known as the Panthers, compete in archery, basketball, baseball, cheerleading, cross county, football, golf, soccer, softball, tennis, track and field, volleyball, and wrestling. The football team won the Class A State Championship in 1987, 1988, 1989, 2015, 2019, 2021, and 2022.  Also amongst the extracurricular activities is in the music department offers chorus and concert, marching, and jazz bands. Other extra- curricular activities include Forever Green; FCA; FEA; FBLA; Art, Pep and Key Clubs; Academic Team; Theater; National Honor Society; and Student Council.

The cheerleading program at Pikeville High is nationally ranked, with seven UCA National Cheerleading Championship titles (most recently in 2018).  They  won the KAPOS State title in the traditional division five years in a row, 2008-2012. They also won the KHSAA small varsity division three years in a row, 2016-2018.

The boys cross country team at Pikeville High were the 2019 Class A State Runner Ups.

PHS also competes in academic competitions as part of the Kentucky Governor's Cup and KAAC program. Pikeville was the first-ever team winner of the Kentucky Governor's Cup for academic competitions in 1986. The quick recall team also won the KAAC's state tournament in the Governor's Cup competition in 1989, 2003, 2005 and 2013.

The school has several musical and voice ensembles, and the marching band won several high level state competitions in the early 1990s. The drama department frequently puts on well-known musical and dramatic productions, ranging from musicals such as Into the Woods and Beauty and the Beast, to comedic presentations such as Seven Brides for Seven Brothers. Most recently they performed The Cat in the Hat.

References

External links
Pikeville High School

Public high schools in Kentucky
Schools in Pike County, Kentucky
Pikeville, Kentucky